The 2021 Virginia lieutenant gubernatorial election was held on November 2, 2021, to elect the next lieutenant governor of Virginia. Incumbent Democratic Lieutenant Governor Justin Fairfax was eligible to run for a second term, but instead unsuccessfully ran for the Democratic gubernatorial nomination. On November 3, Hala Ayala conceded the race, making Republican Winsome Sears the first black woman to be elected to the lieutenant governorship of Virginia or any statewide office, as well as the first woman elected lieutenant governor in Virginia's history. Sears was also the first Jamaican-American to become a lieutenant governor.

Democratic primary

Candidates

Nominee 
Hala Ayala, member of the Virginia House of Delegates

Eliminated in primary 
Mark Levine, member of the Virginia House of Delegates and former candidate for Virginia's 8th congressional district in 2014
Andria McClellan, Norfolk city councilwoman
Sean Perryman, president of the Fairfax County NAACP
Sam Rasoul, member of the Virginia House of Delegates and nominee for Virginia's 6th congressional district in 2008
Xavier Warren, sports agent

Withdrawn 
Paul Goldman, former chair of the Virginia Democratic Party
Elizabeth Guzmán, member of the Virginia House of Delegates (ran for re-election)
 Kellen Squire, nurse

Declined 
 Justin Fairfax, incumbent lieutenant governor (ran for governor)

Endorsements

Polling

Results

Republican convention 
After months of uncertainty, the Republican Party of Virginia State Central Committee decided to hold an "unassembled convention" to select their nominees for governor, lieutenant governor, and attorney general, as opposed to holding a state run primary.  The convention was held May 8 using ranked choice voting.

Candidates

Nominated at convention 
 Winsome Sears, former member of the Virginia House of Delegates (2002–2004), nominee for Virginia's 3rd congressional district in 2004 and write-in candidate for the U.S. Senate in 2018

Defeated at convention 
Puneet Ahluwalia, business consultant
Lance Allen, security company executive
Glenn Davis, member of the Virginia House of Delegates and candidate for lieutenant governor in 2017
Tim Hugo, former member of the Virginia House of Delegates (2003–2020)
Maeve Rigler, business executive

Endorsements

Results

General election

Endorsements

Polling
Graphical summary

Results

See also 
 2021 United States gubernatorial elections
 2021 Virginia gubernatorial election
 2021 Virginia Attorney General election
2021 Virginia House of Delegates election

Notes

Partisan clients

References

External links 
Official campaign websites
 Hala Ayala (D) for Lieutenant Governor
 Winsome Sears (R) for Lieutenant Governor

Lieutenant Governor
2021
Virginia